Ryan David Lindsay (born December 4, 2001) is a Canadian professional soccer player.

Career

Youth
Lindsay began playing youth soccer with West Ottawa SC and Ottawa South United. Afterwards, he moved to Portugal joining SG Sacavenense, although he was only able to train as he was unable to play in official matches as he did not hold a European passport. After spending a year in Portugal, he returned to Canada, joining the Toronto FC Academy in 2019. In 2020, he joined the youth system of Croatian club Dinamo Zagreb.

Club
In August 2020, Lindsay joined Fortuna liga club Pohronie, and made his debut for the club in a Slovak Cup match on September 8 against Dunajská Lužná.

In October 2020, Canadian Premier League side York United announced they had signed Lindsay to a multi-year deal through 2022, with a club option. In August 2021, York announced that due to an ongoing medical condition, Lindsay was being placed on the season-ending injury list and would not appear for the club during the 2021 season. On October 29, Lindsay announced he was taking a break from the sport due to his continuing medical situation.

In February 2022, he joined Estonian club JK Narva Trans in the Meistriliiga, with Narva spotting him while he was in Finland visiting friends and seeking a team there, where two Finnish clubs were interested in him. During a match on May 25 against FC Flora, Lindsay collapsed mid-game unconscious, and was taken to hospital for examination. Two weeks later, on June 8, he terminated his contract with the club by mutual consent. He recorded one assist in 12 appearances across all competitions.

Career statistics

References

External links
Ryan Lindsay OPSM profile

2001 births
Living people
Canadian soccer players
Association football defenders
Soccer players from Ottawa
Expatriate footballers in Slovakia
Expatriate footballers in Portugal
Expatriate footballers in Croatia
Expatriate footballers in Estonia
Canadian expatriate soccer players
Canadian expatriate sportspeople in Croatia
Canadian expatriate sportspeople in Portugal
Canadian expatriate sportspeople in Slovakia
Canadian expatriate sportspeople in Estonia
Meistriliiga players
Ottawa South United players
Toronto FC players
FK Pohronie players
York United FC players
West Ottawa SC players
JK Narva Trans players